Salmi is a former Soviet Air Force air base in Russia located 50 km northwest of Ilinskiy.  It was shown on the 1974 Department of Defense Global Navigation Chart No. 3 as having jet facilities.  As of 2000 Google Earth indicates it has been dismantled, with some faint outlines still visible.

References
RussianAirFields.com

Soviet Air Force bases